Tannunah (also spelled Tannoula or Tenuny) is a village in northern Syria located northwest of Homs in the Homs Governorate. According to the Syria Central Bureau of Statistics, Tannunah had a population of 882 in the 2004 census. Its inhabitants are predominantly Alawites.

References

Bibliography

 

Populated places in Homs District
Alawite communities in Syria